Ranjan Silva (born Patiharamada Juwan Hewage Sanath Ranjan Silva on 18 November 1988) is a Sri Lankan cricketer. He is a right-handed batsman and a right-arm off-break bowler who plays for Singha Sports Club. He was born in Kalutara.

Silva made his first-class debut in November 2008 against Seeduwa Raddoluwa. In both innings where he batted, he scored a duck. From two overs of bowling, he took figures of 1–13.

External links
Ranjan Silva at CricketArchive 

1988 births
Living people
Sri Lankan cricketers
Singha Sports Club cricketers
Sri Lanka Army Sports Club cricketers